Mubarak Fadl El-Moula (born 8 August 1967) is a Sudanese weightlifter. He competed in the men's middleweight event at the 1992 Summer Olympics.

References

1967 births
Living people
Sudanese male weightlifters
Olympic weightlifters of Sudan
Weightlifters at the 1992 Summer Olympics
Place of birth missing (living people)